Steve Sidwell (born August 30, 1944) is a former American football coach. He coached in the National Football League (NFL) for 22 years and was a college football coach for 16 years.

Coaching career
Sidwell worked as the New Orleans Saints defensive coordinator from 1986 to 1994. In this nine-year span, the Saints led the league twice in fewest points allowed (1991, 1992), in rushing defense (1989) and in passing defense (1992, 1993); this era of Saints defenses was nicknamed the Dome Patrol. He has also held jobs as defensive coordinator of the Houston Oilers, Indianapolis Colts, New England Patriots, and most recently, the Seattle Seahawks.

References

1944 births
Living people
American football linebackers
Colorado Buffaloes football coaches
Colorado Buffaloes football players
Houston Oilers coaches
Indianapolis Colts coaches
National Football League defensive coordinators
New England Patriots coaches
New Orleans Saints coaches
Seattle Seahawks coaches
SMU Mustangs football coaches
UNLV Rebels football coaches
People from Winfield, Kansas